Boronsky is a rural locality (a settlement) and the administrative center of Boronsky Selsoviet, Suyetsky District, Altai Krai, Russia. The population was 220 as of 2013. There are 4 streets.

Geography 
Boronsky is located 26 km south of Verkh-Suyetka (the district's administrative centre) by road. Mikhaylovka is the nearest rural locality.

References 

Rural localities in Suyetsky District